A Place Nearby is a 2000 Danish drama film directed by Kaspar Rostrup and starring Ghita Nørby and Thure Lindhardt. It was Denmark's submission to the 73rd Academy Awards for the Academy Award for Best Foreign Language Film, but was not accepted as a nominee.

Cast
 Ghita Nørby
 Thure Lindhardt
 Frits Helmuth
 Henning Moritzen
 Bodil Lindorff
 Hannah Bjarnhof
 Sarah Boberg
 Thomas Bo Larsen
 Niels Anders Thorn
 Pia Vieth
 Niels Skousen
 Susanne Jagd
 Peter Aude
 Mira Wanting
 Holger Vistisen
 Niels Weyde

See also

 Cinema of Denmark
 List of submissions to the 73rd Academy Awards for Best Foreign Language Film

References

External links
 

2000 films
2000s Danish-language films
2000 drama films
Danish drama films
Films scored by Fuzzy (composer)